In mathematics, Hermite transform is an integral transform named after the mathematician Charles Hermite, which uses Hermite polynomials  as kernels of the transform. This was first introduced by Lokenath Debnath in 1964.

The Hermite transform of a function  is

The inverse Hermite transform is given by

Some Hermite transform pairs

References

Integral transforms
Mathematical physics